The 2016 Moçambola is the 39th season of top-tier football in Mozambique. The season began on 12 March 2016. Ferroviário Beira won their final six matches to pass Songo in the standings and clinch their first league title (they had won two colonial championships prior to independence).

Teams
The league expanded to 16 teams for the 2016 season with Chingale de Tete, Desportivo de Niassa and Estrela Vermelha Beira being promoted from regional groups and only  Ferroviário Quelimane relegated following their last place finish in 2015.

Stadiums and locations

League table

Positions by round

References

Moçambola
Mozambique
Mozambique
football